The men's artistic individual all-around competition at the 2002 Asian Games in Busan, South Korea was held on 1 and 3 October 2002 at the Sajik Gymnasium.

Schedule
All times are Korea Standard Time (UTC+09:00)

Results
Legend
DNS — Did not start

Qualification

Final

References

2002 Asian Games Report, Pages 428–434
 Results

External links
 Official website

Artistic Men Individual